Danielle Friel Otten is a member of the Pennsylvania House of Representatives, representing the 155th district. She is a member of the Democratic Party.

Political career
Running in opposition to the Mariner East 2 Pipeline, Otten defeated East Pikeland Supervisor Ron Graham in the Democratic primary for the 155th district by garnering 82.1% of the vote. Otten defeated incumbent representative Becky Corbin in the 2018 general election, garnering 55% of the vote.

In 2020, Otten won reelection. She defeated a primary challenger, Rose Danese, winning 74% of the vote in the Democratic primary. She went on to win the general election against challenger Michael Taylor, garnering 55% of the vote. 

Otten currently sits on the Aging & Older Adult Services, Environmental Resources & Energy, and Human Services committees.

References

External links
PA House website bio
Democratic Caucus bio

Living people
Women state legislators in Pennsylvania
Democratic Party members of the Pennsylvania House of Representatives
21st-century American politicians
West Chester University alumni
21st-century American women politicians
1977 births
Politicians from Chester County, Pennsylvania